Elizabeth Darrell (born  – ) was the long-term mistress and muse of Sir Thomas Wyatt. They had one surviving child, Francis. Wyatt was married to Elizabeth Brooke, Lady Wyatt whom he had accused of committing adultery, resulting in their separation. She was later rumoured to have been involved with Henry VIII.

Early years

Elizabeth Darrell (sometimes spelt Darell) was the daughter of Sir Edward Darrell of  Littlecote, Wiltshire. If she was born circa 1513, she must have been the daughter of Sir Edward's third wife, Alice Flye Stanhope who married him before 1513. Sir Edward was Chamberlain to Catherine of Aragon. Elizabeth was a servant of the Marchioness of Dorset and then afterward, on an unknown date, she became maid of honour to Queen Catherine. Possibly out of loyalty to Catherine or due to her dislike of Anne Boleyn, Elizabeth refused to take the Oath of Supremacy. When Catherine of Aragon died in January 1536, she left Elizabeth a gift of £200 for her future marriage.

Thomas Wyatt
Around the year 1537, Elizabeth became the mistress of the poet and cousin of the late queen Anne Boleyn, Sir Thomas Wyatt (1503 – 11 October 1542). He was legally married to Elizabeth Brooke, the mother of his son Thomas, although they were separated. Elizabeth bore Sir Thomas three sons: 
 Henry, who died in early infancy 
 Francis, born in 1541 and took the surname of Darrell
 Edward, whose date of birth is unknown. He may have been born after his father's death.

The identity of Edward Wyatt, who was later executed for his part in the Wyatt's Rebellion of 1554, led by Sir Thomas Wyatt, the younger is unclear. Some sources claim that he was the illegitimate son of Thomas Wyatt the elder and Elizabeth Darrell, while others insist that he was the son of Thomas Wyatt the younger. Kenneth Muir in  'The Life and Letters of Sir Thomas Wyatt' , asserts that Elizabeth Darrell was the mistress of Sir Thomas Wyatt the elder and quotes various state papers to support this view. Only Francis is mentioned in Thomas Wyatt the elder's will, although it is possible that Edward may have been born after his father's death. Sir Thomas Wyatt the elder is known to have had an illegitimate daughter, however, the identity of the mother is unknown.

Sir Thomas left Elizabeth properties in Dorset. Sir Thomas the Younger transferred Tarrant, Kent to Francis  Wyatt in 1542 (or, according to other sources, to Elizabeth in 1544). With the attainder of Sir Thomas the Younger in 1554, those properties held by Elizabeth that would have gone to him on her death, went to the Crown instead. She was in possession of Tintinhull in 1547 but it was occupied by the Crown's tenant, Sir William Petre, in 1556, and papers relating to the lease suggest that Elizabeth had died. The parsonage at Stoke, Somerset was leased to Elizabeth in 1548 and around 1554, at about the same time Mary I seems to have paid Elizabeth a legacy left to her by Queen Catherine of Aragon, Elizabeth married Robert Strode.

In popular culture
Canadian actress Krystin Pellerin portrayed Darrell in several episodes of The Tudors the second season. Her fate is however dramatically altered. Instead of returning to royal service after the death of her mistress, as is historically accurate, Darrell hangs herself from the beams of her mistress's former home. The show is correct however in portraying Darrell's and Wyatt's affair. This is the only known portrayal of Elizabeth Darrell in popular culture. She also appears in Hilary Mantel’s Wolf Hall trilogy as an attendant of Catherine of Aragon and later of Princess Mary, and in Elizabeth Cook's Lux as she moves from loyalty to Katherine (as it is spelt in the novel) to Wyatt.

References

Bibliography

External links 
 A Who’s Who of Tudor Women

British maids of honour
16th-century English women
Year of birth uncertain
1556 deaths
Household of Catherine of Aragon